is a retired Japanese baseball player. He was with the Hiroshima Toyo Carp of Japan's Central League.

He was born in Saiki, Ōita.

He led his team into League Champion (1991).

His number #7, one of the Honored Numbers of Hiroshima Carp.

Career
 1st play on April 9, 1989.
 1st stolen base on April 12, 1989.
 1st hit on May 4, 1989.
 1st RBI on May 4, 1989.
 1st home run on April 15, 1990.
 Greatest number of Hits (1994 and 1995).
 SB Award winner (1990, 1991 and 1994).
 Best nine of the year (1991, 1995 and 1996).
 Golden Glove Award winner (1995).
 169 HR, 765 RBI, 2020 H, 250 SB.
 Last game on October 12, 2005.
 Hiroshima Prefectural Prize of Honour (2005).

Statistics

Kansas City Royals
On August 12, 2016, Kenjiro became a special advisor to the Kansas City Royals baseball operations.

External links
 
 THE GOLDEN PLAYERS CLUB (Japanese)

1966 births
Living people
Baseball people from Ōita Prefecture
Komazawa University alumni
Nippon Professional Baseball infielders
Hiroshima Toyo Carp players
Baseball players at the 1988 Summer Olympics
Olympic baseball players of Japan
Olympic silver medalists for Japan
Managers of baseball teams in Japan
Hiroshima Toyo Carp managers
Medalists at the 1988 Summer Olympics